Cydonia is a region on the planet Mars that has attracted both scientific and popular interest. The name originally referred to the albedo feature (distinctively coloured area) that was visible from earthbound telescopes. The area borders the plains of Acidalia Planitia and the highlands of Arabia Terra. The region includes the named features Cydonia Mensae, an area of flat-topped mesa-like features; Cydonia Colles, a region of small hills or knobs; and Cydonia Labyrinthus, a complex of intersecting valleys. As with other albedo features on Mars, the name Cydonia was drawn from classical antiquity, in this case from Kydonia, a historic polis (city state) on the island of Crete.
Cydonia contains the "Face on Mars", located about halfway between the craters Arandas and Bamberg.

Location
Cydonia lies in the planet's northern hemisphere in a transitional zone between the heavily cratered regions to the south and relatively smooth plains to the north. Some planetologists believe that the northern plains may once have been ocean beds, and that Cydonia may once have been a coastal zone. It is in the Mare Acidalium quadrangle.

"Face on Mars"

Cydonia was first imaged in detail by the Viking 1 and Viking 2 orbiters. Eighteen images of the Cydonia region were taken by the orbiters, of which seven have resolutions better than 250 m/pixel (820 ft/pixel). The other eleven images have resolutions that are worse than 550 m/pixel (1800 ft/pixel) and are of limited use for studying surface features. Of the seven good images, the lighting and time at which two pairs of images were taken are so close as to reduce the number to five distinct images. The Mission to Mars: Viking Orbiter Images of Mars CD-ROM set image numbers for these are: 035A72 (VO-1010), 070A13 (VO-1011), 561A25 (VO-1021), 673B54 & 673B56 (VO-1063), and 753A33 & 753A34 (VO-1028).

In one of the images taken by Viking 1 on July 25, 1976, a  Cydonian mesa, situated at 40.75° north latitude and 9.46° west longitude, had the appearance of a humanoid face. When the image was originally acquired, Viking chief scientist Gerry Soffen dismissed the "Face on Mars" in image 035A72 as a "trick of light and shadow". A second image, 070A13, also shows the "face", and was acquired 35 Viking orbits later at a different sun-angle from the 035A72 image. This latter discovery was made independently by Vincent DiPietro and Gregory Molenaar, two computer engineers at NASA's Goddard Space Flight Center. DiPietro and Molenaar discovered the two misfiled images, Viking frames 035A72 and 070A13, while searching through NASA archives. The resolution of these images was of about 50 m/pixel.

Later imagery
More than 20 years after the Viking 1 images were taken, a succession of spacecraft visited Mars and made new observations of the Cydonia region. These spacecraft have included NASA's Mars Global Surveyor (1997–2006) and Mars Reconnaissance Orbiter (2006–), and the European Space Agency's Mars Express probe (2003–). In contrast to the relatively low resolution of the Viking images of Cydonia, these new platforms afford much improved resolution. For instance, the Mars Express images are at a resolution of 14 m/pixel (46 ft/pixel) or better. By combining data from the High Resolution Stereo Camera (HRSC) on the Mars Express probe and the Mars Orbiter Camera (MOC) on board NASA's Mars Global Surveyor it has been possible to create a three-dimensional representation of the "Face on Mars".

Since it was originally first imaged, the face has been accepted by scientists as an optical illusion, an example of the psychological phenomenon of pareidolia. After analysis of the higher resolution Mars Global Surveyor data NASA stated that "a detailed analysis of multiple images of this feature reveals a natural looking Martian hill whose illusory face-like appearance depends on the viewing angle and angle of illumination". Similar optical illusions can be found in the geology of Earth; examples include the Old Man of the Mountain, the Romanian Sphinx, Giewont, the Pedra da Gávea, the Old Man of Hoy, Stac Levenish, Sleeping Ute, and the Badlands Guardian.

Speculation
The Cydonia facial pareidolia inspired individuals and organizations interested in extraterrestrial intelligence and visitations to Earth, and the images were published in this context in 1977. Some commentators, most notably Richard C. Hoagland, believe the "Face on Mars" to be evidence of a long-lost Martian civilization along with other features they believe are present, such as apparent pyramids, which they argue are part of a ruined city.

While accepting the "face" as a subject for scientific study, astronomer Carl Sagan criticized much of the speculation concerning it in the chapter "The Man in the Moon and the Face on Mars" in his 1995 book The Demon-Haunted World. The shape-from-shading work by Dr. Mark J. Carlotto was used by Sagan in a chapter of his famous Cosmos series. In 1998 a news article about the "Space Face" quoted a scientist talking about deciphering "intelligent design" in nature. A cutting of this was used by Charles Thaxton as an overhead visual for a lecture at Princeton, in his first public use of the term "intelligent design" as a substitute for creation science.

The "face" is also a common topic among skeptics groups, who use it as an example of credulity. They point out that there are other faces on Mars but these do not elicit the same level of study. One example is the Galle Crater, which takes the form of a smiley, while others resemble Kermit the Frog or other celebrities. On this latter similarity, Discover magazine's "Skeptical Eye" column ridiculed Hoagland's claims, asking if he believed the aliens were fans of Sesame Street.

Interactive Mars map

See also

 
 
 
 
 , home to another "face"

References

External links

NASA or ESA
 Cydonia – the face on Mars, ESA's overview of features in Cydonia region
 Viking Project Information, NASA
 Past Missions: Viking, NASA
 Mars Express, ESA
 Mars Express: Home, NASA
 Mars Global Surveyor, NASA
 Astronomy Picture of the Day: 2006 September 25, "Mars Express Close-Up of the Face on Mars"
 Astronomy Picture of the Day: 2006 September 26, "Mars Express: Return to Cydonia"
Non-Space Agency
 High-resolution images of Cydonia, Freie Universität Berlin – Mars Express orbiter data (orbit 3253)
 Discussion of MOC and "Face on Mars", Malin Space Science Systems (also, The "Face on Mars")
 "The Face on Mars" at Google Mars
 Interactive 3D "Face on Mars", Shockwave Player at MarsQuest Online.
 The exact position of the Face on Mars on Geody, provides link to NASA World Wind, among others
 Face on Mars, entry in the Skeptic's Dictionary
 Hoagland debunking at Bad Astronomy, a discussion of the science and pseudoscience of Cydonia -->
 
 

Albedo features on Mars
Mare Acidalium quadrangle